This is a list of electoral results for the Division of Moira in Australian federal elections from the division's creation in 1901 until its abolition in 1906.

Members

Election results

Elections in the 1900s

1903

1901

External links
 Australian Electoral Commission. Federal election results
 Carr, Adam. Psephos

Australian federal electoral results by division